Yair may refer to:

A spelling variant of the Jewish name Jair or Ya'ir
Yair (name), list of people with the name Yair
Yair, Scottish Borders, a location in Scotland